Boven Bolivia is a hamlet on the island of Bonaire at the head of a lagoon on the island's east coast.

Boven Bolivia started as a plantation. Guano was discovered in the late 19th century, however the plantation was later abandoned and only ruins remain.

References

Populated places in Bonaire